Edward H. Morris (May 30, 1858 – February 3, 1943) was an American lawyer and state legislator in Illinois.

Biography
Edward H. Morris was born in Flemingsburg, Kentucky, on May 30, 1858. He graduated from St. Patrick's High School, Chicago. He was admitted to the Chicago Bar in 1879 and became the fifth African American lawyer admitted to the Illinois Bar.

He represented Cook County in the Illinois House of Representatives from 1890 to 1892 and from 1902 to 1904.

In 1919 he was appointed to the Chicago Commission on Race Relations.

Edward H. Morris died in Washington, D.C., on February 3, 1943.

References

1858 births
1943 deaths
African-American lawyers
Members of the Illinois House of Representatives
People from Flemingsburg, Kentucky
20th-century African-American people